In the mathematical field of differential geometry, a calibrated manifold is a Riemannian manifold (M,g) of dimension n equipped with a differential p-form φ (for some 0 ≤ p ≤ n) which is a calibration, meaning that:
 φ is closed: dφ = 0, where d is the exterior derivative
 for any x ∈ M and any oriented p-dimensional subspace ξ of TxM, φ|ξ = λ volξ with λ ≤ 1. Here volξ is the volume form of ξ with respect to g.
Set Gx(φ) = { ξ as above : φ|ξ = volξ }. (In order for the theory to be nontrivial, we need  Gx(φ) to be nonempty.) Let G(φ) be the union of Gx(φ) for x in M.

The theory of calibrations is due to R. Harvey and B. Lawson and others. Much earlier (in 1966) Edmond Bonan introduced G2-manifolds and  Spin(7)-manifolds, constructed all the parallel forms and showed that those manifolds were Ricci-flat. Quaternion-Kähler manifolds were simultaneously studied  in 1967 by Edmond Bonan and Vivian Yoh Kraines and they constructed the parallel 4-form.

Calibrated submanifolds

A p-dimensional submanifold Σ of M is said to be a calibrated submanifold with respect to φ (or simply φ-calibrated) if TΣ lies in G(φ).

A famous one line argument shows that calibrated p-submanifolds minimize volume within their homology class. Indeed, suppose that Σ is calibrated, and Σ ′ is a p submanifold in the same homology class. Then

where the first equality holds because Σ is calibrated, the second equality is Stokes' theorem (as φ is closed), and the inequality holds because φ is a calibration.

Examples

 On a Kähler manifold, suitably normalized powers of the Kähler form are calibrations, and the calibrated submanifolds are the complex submanifolds.  This follows from the Wirtinger inequality.
 On a Calabi–Yau manifold, the real part of a holomorphic volume form (suitably normalized) is a calibration, and the calibrated submanifolds are special Lagrangian submanifolds.
 On a G2-manifold, both the 3-form and the Hodge dual 4-form define calibrations. The corresponding calibrated submanifolds are called associative and coassociative submanifolds.
 On a Spin(7)-manifold, the defining 4-form, known as the Cayley form, is a calibration. The corresponding calibrated submanifolds are called Cayley submanifolds.

References
 
.                
.                               
 .
 .
 .
 .
 .
 .
 .
 .
.
 .
 .
 .
 .
 .
 .
 .
 .
 .
 .

Differential geometry
Riemannian geometry
Structures on manifolds